Outside Looking In is a 1925 Broadway three-act comedy written by Maxwell Anderson, produced by Kenneth Macgowan, Robert Edmond Jones and Eugene O'Neill and directed by Augustin Duncan.

Background
Cleon Throckmorton created the scenic design. The play was adapted from Jim Tully's autobiography Beggars of Life: A Hobo Autobiography. The show ran for 113 performances from  September 7, 1925 to November 1925 at the Greenwich Village Theatre and continuing from November 1925 to December 1925 at the 39th Street Theatre. This was Jimmy Cagney's legitimate stage debut playing the hobo Little Red.

Cast

 Reginald Barlow as Baldy	
 Charles A. Bickford as Oklahoma Red	
 James Cagney as Little Red
 Blythe Daly as Edna
 David A. Leonard as Arkansas Snake	
 Harry D. Blakemore as	Mose	
 Raphael Byrnes as Bill	
 Wallace House as Skelly	
 Sidney Machat as Ukie	
 Barry Macollum as	Hopper	
 James Martin as Rubin	
 Richard Sullivan as Blind Sims

References

Further reading
Tully, Jim (1924) Beggars of Life: A Hobo Autobiography (AK Press)

External links 
 

1925 plays
Broadway plays
Plays by Maxwell Anderson
Plays set in North Dakota
Plays set in Montana